The 2008–2010 specials of the British science fiction television programme Doctor Who are five specials that linked the programme's fourth and fifth series. The specials were produced in lieu of a full series in 2009, to allow the new production team for the programme enough time to prepare for the fifth series in 2010, in light of Russell T Davies's decision to step down as showrunner, with Steven Moffat taking his place in the fifth series. The first special was broadcast on 25 December 2008 with "The Next Doctor", with the last special, the two-part episode "The End of Time", broadcasting over two weeks on 25 December 2009 and 1 January 2010.

The specials started production in April 2008 for "The Next Doctor", and filming for the final special "The End of Time" began in March 2009. Two supplemental episodes were also filmed alongside the specials. "Music of the Spheres" was filmed for the 2008 Doctor Who Prom in July 2008, and the animated six-episode serial Dreamland was produced for the BBC's Red Button service, which was released over six consecutive days in November 2009. Midway through the sequence of specials (commencing with "Planet of the Dead"), production switched to filming in high-definition.

The specials included appearances of one-off companions, portrayed by David Morrissey, Velile Tshabalala, Michelle Ryan, Lindsay Duncan and Bernard Cribbins, as well as featuring cast from previous seasons, including Catherine Tate, Billie Piper, Freema Agyeman, Noel Clarke, John Barrowman, Elisabeth Sladen and John Simm. The two-part episode "The End of Time" was the last episode of Doctor Who to feature David Tennant as the Tenth Doctor until the 2013 special "The Day of the Doctor", and the last episode of Doctor Who to have Russell T Davies as the showrunner and head writer until the 2023 specials.

Episodes

"The End of Time" was the first two-part episode with an overall title and episode numbers since Survival in season 26, the final serial broadcast during the series' original run. It is one of only two stories in the revival era to do this, the other being "Spyfall" in 2020.

Supplemental episodes 
"Music of the Spheres" was filmed for the 2008 Doctor Who Prom, and the animated six-episode serial Dreamland was produced for the BBC's Red Button service.

Casting

Main characters

These specials marked David Tennant's final run of episodes as the Tenth Doctor and Matt Smith's first appearance as the newly regenerated Eleventh Doctor. They also featured a string of one-time companions beginning in "The Next Doctor" with David Morrissey as Jackson Lake, a man who thinks himself to be the Doctor and his "companion" Rosita Farisi, played by Velile Tshabalala. "Planet of the Dead" featured former EastEnders actress Michelle Ryan as a young thrill-seeking burglar, Lady Christina de Souza.  "The Waters of Mars" starred Lindsay Duncan as Adelaide Brooke, Captain of Bowie Base One on Mars. Finally, the two-part "The End of Time" had Bernard Cribbins as recurring character Wilfred Mott as a full-fledged companion for the first and last time.

Guest characters
Other companions appear briefly during the Tenth Doctor's "farewell tour": Catherine Tate as Donna Noble, Billie Piper as Rose Tyler, Camille Coduri as Jackie Tyler, Freema Agyeman as Martha Jones, Noel Clarke as Mickey Smith, John Barrowman as Captain Jack Harkness, Elisabeth Sladen as Sarah Jane Smith, and Jessica Hynes as Verity Newman, whose grandmother, Joan Redfern, fell in love with the human John Smith in "Human Nature" and "The Family of Blood". John Simm reprises his role as the Master in "The End of Time".

Production

Development

In his book The Writer's Tale, Russell T Davies reveals that the plan to have only specials for 2009 was to allow the new production team, headed by new lead writer Steven Moffat, enough time to prepare for the full fifth series in 2010. David Tennant took this opportunity to appear in a stage production of Hamlet. For practical reasons, these specials continued to use series 4 production codes.

Russell T Davies announced his departure from the series as show runner, head writer and executive producer of the show on 20 May 2008, with his final episode airing in 2010. The specials not only marked an end to Davies's role as the show runner, but also Tennant's reign as the Doctor. On 28 October 2008 at the National Television Awards during his speech after winning Outstanding Drama Performance for his work in the fourth series, Tennant announced that he would be standing down as the Doctor for the fifth series and that the specials would be his last.

Writing

Davies' role in late 2008 was split between writing the 2009 specials and preparing for the transition between his and Moffat's production team; one chapter of The Writer's Tale: The Final Chapter discusses plans between him, Gardner, and Tennant to announce Tennant's departure live during ITV's National Television Awards in October 2008. His final full script for Doctor Who was finished in the early morning of 4 March 2009, and filming of the episode closed on 20 May 2009. Russell T Davies co-wrote "Planet of the Dead" with Gareth Roberts, the first writing partnership for the show since its 2005 revival. Davies also co-wrote the next episode, "The Waters of Mars", with Phil Ford.

Writing in his regular column in Doctor Who Magazine 416, Davies revealed that the original title for "Part One" of "The End of Time" was "The Final Days of Planet Earth", while "Part Two" was always referred to as "The End of Time". Due to the sheer scale of the story, however, it was decided that both instalments needed the same title, differentiated by part numbers, the first such instance since Survival. Davies's script for the second episode finished with the Tenth Doctor's final line, "I don't want to go", followed by action text describing the regeneration and ending with the words, "And there he is. Blinking. Dazed. The New Man." He then sent the script to his successor Steven Moffat, who is responsible for all of the Eleventh Doctor's dialogue that follows. Moffat, as incoming executive producer, also assisted in the production of the final scene.

Music
Murray Gold composed the soundtrack to these episodes, with orchestration by Ben Foster.

Filming
"The Next Doctor" was filmed in April 2008 at Gloucester Cathedral, St Woolos Cemetery in Newport and the streets of Gloucester, where shooting was hampered by up to 1,000 onlookers. The main setting of Torchwood, their Torchwood Hub was also redesigned and used as the workshop for the children. 

"Planet of the Dead" was the first Doctor Who episode to be filmed in high-definition, prior episodes having been filmed in standard-definition and then upscaled for broadcast on BBC HD. The two major filming locations of "Planet of the Dead" were the desert of Dubai, used for scenes on the "planet of the dead", and the Queen's Gate Tunnel in Butetown, Cardiff, used for the majority of Earth-bound scenes. 

Filming for "The Waters of Mars" began on 23 February 2009. In late February, David Tennant, Duncan and other actors were seen filming in Victoria Place, Newport. The filming took place on a city street, which the production team covered with artificial snow. The glasshouse scenes were filmed in the National Botanic Garden of Wales, Carmarthenshire. The first location filming for "The End of Time" took place on Saturday, 21 March 2009 at a bookstore in Cardiff. Jessica Hynes was filmed signing a book titled A Journal of Impossible Things, by Verity Newman.

The specials were produced as follows:

Release

Broadcast
The 2008–2010 specials are five specials that linked the programme's fourth and fifth series. They began on 25 December 2008 with "The Next Doctor", with three airing in 2009, and concluded on 1 January 2010 with the second part of "The End of Time".

Doctor Who Confidential also aired alongside each episode of the specials, continuing on from the previous series. "The Next Doctor" was the first special to be accompanied by its own Confidential episode, and was considered part of the fourth Confidential series. Alongside the accompanying episodes for each of the specials, three additional Confidential episodes alongside the specials' episodes: one for the past five Christmas specials, one for the 2008 Doctor Who prom, and one for the revealing of Matt Smith as the Eleventh Doctor.

Home media

In print

Reception

Ratings

Critical reception
Preliminary figures show that "The Next Doctor" had a viewing audience of 11.71 million during its original airing, with a peak at 12.58 million viewers. It was the second most watched programme of Christmas Day 2008, behind Wallace and Gromit's A Matter of Loaf and Death. Final viewing figures show an audience of 13.1 million viewers. The episode had an Appreciation Index figure of 86 (considered Excellent), making it the second most-enjoyed programme on mainstream television on Christmas Day. The only programme to score higher was A Matter of Loaf and Death, which scored 88.

Overnight figures estimated that "Planet of the Dead" was watched by 8.41 million people. The initial showing had an Appreciation Index of 88: considered excellent. The final viewing figure for the initial broadcast was 9.54 million viewers on BBC One, making it the fifth most watched programme of the week and the most watched programme aired on BBC HD at that time. Including repeats in the following week and viewings on the BBC iPlayer, 13.89 million viewers watched the episode in total. The episode received average critical reviews. Simon Brew of science fiction blog Den of Geek said the episode was "by turns ambitious and predictable" but "still quite entertaining". Brew positively reviewed Michelle Ryan's performance—finding it on par with her role in Bionic Woman rather than her role as Zoe Slater in EastEnders. He closed his review by saying that "'Planet of the Dead' was passable enough": he thought it "never really gelled" for him. Charlie Jane Anders of io9 compared it to two previous episodes, "The Impossible Planet" and "Midnight", both of which she enjoyed. She thought that the episode was "a pretty solid adventure with a cool set of monsters".

According to overnight viewing figures, "The Waters of Mars" was watched by 9.1 million people. The episode also received an Appreciation Index score of 88. More accurate, consolidated statistics from the BARB state that official ratings ended up at 10.32 million viewers for the UK premiere and that "The Waters of Mars" was the fifth most watched programme of the week. It was first broadcast on a Sunday, the only non-Christmas episode of the revived series to air outside the usual Saturday evening slot. Critical reception was generally positive. Sam Wollaston of The Guardian complimented the episode for showing "a side to the Doctor ... that we haven't really seen before – indecisive, confused, at times simply plain wrong" and Tennant's tenure of the part overall as bringing "humanity and humour to the part" Though Robert Colvile of The Daily Telegraph criticised "the glaring inconsistencies", he complimented the scenario for "allow[ing] us to watch Tennant wrestle with his conscience and curiosity ... [in what] was a logical progression for the character".

Overnight ratings placed Part One of "The End of Time" as the third most-watched programme of Christmas Day, and an appreciation index score of 87, considered 'Excellent'. Final consolidated ratings placed Part One as the third most watched program of Christmas Day, behind The Royle Family and EastEnders with a final figure of 11.57 million viewers. This is the highest timeshift that the show has received since its revival (the previous highest being 11.4 million for The Next Doctor in Christmas 2008). Overnight ratings placed Part Two as the second most-watched programme of New Year's Day, behind EastEnders, with a provisional viewing figure of 10.4 million viewers. Official BARB ratings placed Part Two as the second most watched programme of the week behind EastEnders at 11.79 million viewers. In a review of the first part of the story, Peter Robins of The Guardian concedes that when the story is done it is the quieter more emotional parts from the beginning of the episode that the viewer will remember. Robins also notes that Cribbins seems to be playing the same role that Tate did by "becoming the tragic hero while remaining the comic relief". Andrew Pettie of The Daily Telegraph commented on Cribbins' performance, and states that he cut a King Lear like figure and notes that the Master's plan was evil even by his standards. Mark Lawson of The Guardian stated that the plot device of the Master repopulating the human race as himself "gave Simm the chance to wear a lot of different costumes and the special effects department to show some of the digital ingenuity which has helped the show's renaissance." Lawson also went on to praise Tennant for bringing a "proper tragic force" to the role and was again shown in this last story. Lawson states that "the final line Davies gave to Tennant was a suddenly regretful "I don't want to go!", and it is likely that, somewhere inside, both actor and writer feel a little like that."

Awards and nominations

Soundtrack
Selected pieces of score from these specials (from "The Next Doctor" to "The End of Time"), as composed by Murray Gold, were released on 4 October 2010 by Silva Screen Records under the title of "Series 4 – The Specials". 47 tracks were released on two CD, with a total length of 116 minutes, 9 seconds. The iTunes Store release also includes a digital booklet and two bonus tracks, one each from "The Next Doctor" and "The End of Time".

References

Books

External links

 
 

2008 British television seasons
2009 British television seasons
2010 British television seasons
Series 04a
Series 04a